Corey Bushe Fuller (born May 1, 1971) is an American football coach and former player. He was the interim head football coach at Florida A&M University in 2014. Fuller was promoted from defensive backs coach to interim head coach after having been the head football coach at East Gadsden High School from 2010 to 2012. He played in the National Football League (NFL) for ten seasons, from 1995 to 2004, with the Minnesota Vikings, Cleveland Browns, and Baltimore Ravens. In his NFL career, Fuller played in 152 games, intercepting 17 passes for 145 yards and one touchdown.

A 5'10", 209-lb. defensive back from Florida State University, Fuller was selected by the Vikings in the second round (55th overall) of the 1995 NFL Draft. He played high school football at James S. Rickards High School.

Following a 1996 game between the Minnesota Vikings and the Green Bay Packers, Fuller was fined $30,000 for poking the left eye of Packers center Frank Winters.

Head coaching record

References

External links
 Florida A&M profile
 

1971 births
Living people
American football cornerbacks
American football safeties
Baltimore Ravens players
Cleveland Browns players
Florida A&M Rattlers football coaches
Florida State Seminoles football players
Minnesota Vikings players
High school football coaches in Florida
Coaches of American football from Florida
Players of American football from Tallahassee, Florida
African-American coaches of American football
African-American players of American football
20th-century African-American sportspeople
21st-century African-American sportspeople